The Final Sanction may refer to:
The Final Sanction (novel), a 1999 novel
The Final Sanction (film), a 1990 film